Methyl tertiary-butyl ether (MTBE), also known as methyl tert-butyl ether and tert-butyl methyl ether, is an organic compound with a structural formula (CH3)3COCH3. MTBE is a volatile, flammable, and colorless liquid that is sparingly soluble in water. Primarily used as a fuel additive, MTBE is blended into gasoline to increase its octane rating and knock resistance, and reduce unwanted emissions.

Production and properties
MTBE is manufactured via the chemical reaction of methanol and isobutylene. Methanol is primarily derived from natural gas, where steam reforming converts the various light hydrocarbons in natural gas (primarily methane) into carbon monoxide and hydrogen. The resulting gases then further react in the presence of a catalyst to form methanol. Isobutylene can be produced through a variety of methods. n-butane can be isomerized  into isobutane which can be dehydrogenated to isobutylene. In the Halcon process, t-Butyl hydroperoxide derived from isobutane oxygenation is reacted with propylene to produce propylene oxide and t-butanol. The t-butanol can be dehydrated to isobutylene.

MTBE production in the U.S. peaked in 1999 at 260,000 barrels per day before dropping down to about 50,000 barrels per day and holding steady, mostly for the export market. After the purchase of SABIC, oil giant Saudi Aramco is now considered to be the world's largest producer with an estimated production capacity of 2.37 million metric tons per year (mt/yr). Worldwide production capacity of MTBE in 2018 was estimated to be 35 million metric tons.

Uses
MTBE is used as a fuel component in fuel for gasoline engines. It is one of a group of chemicals commonly known as oxygenates because they raise the oxygen content of gasoline.

As anti-knocking agent
In the U.S. MTBE has been used in gasoline at low levels since 1979, replacing tetraethyllead (TEL) as an antiknock (octane rating) additive to prevent engine knocking. Oxygenates also help gasoline burn more completely, reducing tailpipe emissions and dilute or displace gasoline components such as aromatics (e.g., benzene). Before the introduction of other oxygenates and octane enhancers, refiners chose MTBE for its blending characteristics and low cost.

Alternatives to MTBE as an anti-knock agent
Other oxygenates are available as additives for gasoline including ethanol and other ethers such as ETBE.

Ethanol has been advertised as a safe alternative by agricultural and other interest groups in the U.S. and Europe. In 2003, California was the first U.S. state to start replacing MTBE with ethanol.

An alternative to ethanol is ETBE, which is manufactured from ethanol and isobutene. Its performance as an additive is similar to MTBE, but due to the higher price of ethanol compared to methanol, it is more expensive.

Higher quality gasoline is also an alternative, so that additives such as MTBE are unnecessary. Iso-octane itself is used. MTBE plants can be retrofitted to produce iso-octane from isobutylene.

As a solvent
MTBE is used in industry as a safer alternative to diethyl ether (which is commonly used in academic research) as the tert-butyl group prevents MTBE from forming potentially explosive peroxides. It also is used as a solvent in academic research, although it is used less commonly than diethyl ether. Although an ether, MTBE is a poor Lewis base and does not support formation of Grignard reagents. It is also unstable toward strong acids. It reacts dangerously with bromine.

MTBE forms azeotropes with water (52.6 °C; 96.5% MTBE) and methanol (51.3 °C; 68.6% MTBE).

In a medical procedure called contact dissolution therapy, MTBE is injected directly into the gallbladder to dissolve gallstones.

Persistence and pervasiveness in the environment
MTBE gives water an unpleasant taste at very low concentrations. MTBE often is introduced into water-supply aquifers by leaking underground storage tanks (USTs) at gasoline stations or by gasoline containing MTBE being spilled onto the ground. The higher water solubility and persistence of MTBE cause it to travel faster and farther than many other components of gasoline when released into an aquifer.

MTBE is biodegraded by the action of bacteria. In the proper type of bioreactor, such as a fluidized bed bioreactor, MTBE may be removed rapidly and economically from water to undetectable levels. Activated carbon produced from coconut shells and optimized for MTBE adsorption may reduce MTBE to undetectable levels, although this level of reduction is likely to occur only in the most ideal circumstances. There are currently no known published cases of any in-situ treatment method that has been capable of reducing contaminant concentrations to baseline (pre-development) conditions within the aquifer soil matrix.

According to the International Agency for Research on Cancer (IARC), a cancer research agency of the World Health Organization, MTBE is not classified as a human carcinogen. MTBE may be tasted in water at concentrations of 5–15 µg/L (5-15ppb).

As of 2007, researchers have limited data about the health effects of ingestion of MTBE. The United States Environmental Protection Agency (EPA) has concluded that available data are inadequate to quantify health risks of MTBE at low exposure levels in drinking water, but the data support the conclusion that MTBE is a potential human carcinogen at high doses.

Regulation and litigation in the U.S.

Restrictions on MTBE manufacturing and use
In 2000, EPA drafted plans to phase out the use of MTBE nationwide over four years. Some states enacted MTBE prohibitions without waiting for federal restrictions. California banned MTBE as a gasoline additive in 2002. The State of New York banned the use of MTBE as a "fuel additive", effective in 2004. However, MTBE is still legal in the state for other industrial uses.

The Energy Policy Act of 2005, as approved by the U.S. House of Representatives, did not include a provision for shielding MTBE manufacturers from water contamination lawsuits. This provision was first proposed in 2003 and had been thought by some to be a priority of Tom DeLay and Rep. Joe Barton, then chairman of the Energy and Commerce Committee. This bill did include a provision that gave MTBE makers, including some major oil companies, $2 billion in transition assistance while MTBE was phased out over the following nine years. Due to opposition in the Senate, the conference report dropped all MTBE provisions. The final bill was signed into law by President George W. Bush. The lack of MTBE liability protection is resulting in a switchover to the use of ethanol as a gasoline additive.

Cleanup costs and litigation
MTBE removal from groundwater and soil contamination in the U.S. was estimated to cost from $1 billion to US$30 billion, including removing the compound from aquifers and municipal water supplies and replacing leaky underground oil tanks. In one case, the cost to oil companies to clean up the MTBE in wells belonging to the city of Santa Monica, California was estimated to exceed $200 million. In another case, New York City estimated a $250 million cost for cleanup of a single wellfield in the borough of Queens in 2009. In 2013 a jury awarded the State of New Hampshire $236 million in damages in order to treat groundwater contaminated by MTBE.

Many lawsuits are still pending regarding MTBE contamination of public and private drinking water supplies.

Drinking water regulations
EPA first listed MTBE in 1998 as a candidate for development of a national Maximum Contaminant Level (MCL) standard in drinking water. As of 2020 the agency has not announced whether it will develop an MCL. EPA uses toxicity data in developing MCLs for public water systems.

California established a state-level MCL for MTBE, 13 micrograms per liter, in 2000.

See also
Cyclopentyl methyl ether (CPME)
Di-tert-butyl ether
List of gasoline additives
tert-Amyl methyl ether (TAME)

References

External links
 MTBE in Europe
 MTBE webpage from the EPA
 Summary of health effects data from IACR

Hazardous air pollutants
Dialkyl ethers
Ether solvents
Pollutants
Soil contamination
Oxygenates
Tert-butyl compounds